The 1982 Team Ice Racing World Championship was the fourth edition of the Team World Championship. The final was held on ?, 1982, in Kalinin (Tver) in the Soviet Union.

Classification

See also 
 1982 Individual Ice Speedway World Championship
 1982 Speedway World Team Cup in classic speedway
 1982 Individual Speedway World Championship in classic speedway

References 

Ice speedway competitions
World